is an Okinawan martial arts master and head of the Shōrin-ryū Kishaba Juku.

Life and Karate-do

Shinzato was born in Manila, in the Philippines. His father was a fisherman. During the Second World War, when the war reached the Pacific, his family relocated to Ueyonabaru, Yonabaru-cho, Okinawa.

Whilst attending the University of the Ryukyus where he studied English and English Literature. He started to practice Karate in 1957 under Tsunetaka Shimabukuro. After completing his degree in Japan he then studied Applied Linguistics in the United States at Indiana University.

He returned to Okinawa in 1967 where he joined the dojo of Shoshin Nagamine. Shinzato translated Nagamine's book "The Essence of Okinawan Karate-do" into the English language. Shinzato also studied under Seigi Nakamura and Chokei Kishaba. Shinzato is a professor at Okinawa International University and the head of Okinawa Karate-do Shōrin-ryū Kishaba Juku.

Shinzato is also a member of the Okinawan Karate-do and Kobudo Encyclopaedia Committee.

Okinawa Karate-do Shōrin-ryū Kishaba Juku

Shinzato became the Juko Cho, i.e., the head of Shōrin-ryū Kishaba Juku, after the passing of Chokei Kishaba in the year 2000.

Dojos affiliated with Kishaba Juku are located in Japan, the United States, France, Germany, Israel, and Slovenia. Within the United States there are dojos in California, Connecticut, Florida, Hawaii, Illinois, Nebraska, New Jersey, New York, Ohio, Oregon, and Virginia.

See also 
 Okinawan martial arts

References

Okinawan male karateka
1939 births
Living people
Indiana University alumni
Martial arts writers
Karate coaches
Shōrin-ryū practitioners